The City Beautiful may refer to:

Orlando, Florida
Chandigarh, India
The City Beautiful (1914), a short film directed by and starring Wallace Reid with Dorothy Gish co-starring (Wallace Reid filmography)
City Beautiful movement, an urban planning movement
The City Beautiful (novel), a historical fantasy novel by Aden Polydoros